Bob Davis may refer to:

Sports

American football
Bob Davis (American football coach) (1908–1965), American football coach at Colorado State University (1947–1955)
Bob Davis (end) (1921–1998), American football end
Bob Davis (tackle) (1927–2010), NFL tackle
Bob Davis (American football, born 1930) (1930–2011), American football and wrestling coach
Bob Davis (quarterback) (born 1945), AFL quarterback

Other sports
Bob Davis (ice hockey) (1899–1970), Canadian ice hockey player
Bob Davis (basketball coach) (1927–2021), American basketball coach
Bob Davis (Australian rules footballer) (1928–2011)
Bob Davis (pitcher) (1933–2001), American baseball pitcher
Bob Davis (sportscaster) (born 1945), radio broadcaster with the Kansas City Royals and the Kansas Jayhawks football and basketball teams
Bob Davis (basketball player) (born 1950), retired basketball small forward
Bob Davis (catcher) (born 1952), Major League Baseball catcher

Others
Bob Davis (editor) (fl. 1920s), editor of Argosy magazine
Bob Davis (born 1949), American economist and Commodity Futures Trading Commission commissioner
Bob Davis (businessman) (born 1956), American businessman and CEO of Lycos

See also
Bob David (1919–2001), Canadian ice hockey player
Bob Davids (1926–2002), American baseball writer and researcher
Robert Davis (disambiguation)